Ipasha Falls is a waterfall located in Glacier National Park, Montana, US. Ipasha Falls descends from Ipasha Glacier to Ipasha Lake and is recorded as having a drop of at least . Located in a remote region north of Many Glacier, the falls can only been seen by a multiday hike on established trails to Mokowanis Lake and then from there along unmaintained trails to Ipasha Lake.

References

Landforms of Glacier County, Montana
Landforms of Glacier National Park (U.S.)
Waterfalls of Glacier National Park (U.S.)